Bishop James Mahoney High School (BJM) is a high school serving grades 9 to 12, located in the Lawson Heights neighbourhood in the north end of Saskatoon, Saskatchewan, Canada. It is also known as Bishop Mahoney High School. It is the only Catholic high school in the north end of Saskatoon, serving the Silverwood Heights, Lawson Heights, River Heights, Richmond Heights, and North Park neighbourhoods.  It is operated by Greater Saskatoon Catholic Schools.

History
Bishop James Mahoney High School opened for classes on September 4, 1984. It is named in honour of the Most Reverend James P. Mahoney, former Bishop of Saskatoon, in recognition of his many contributions to Catholic Education in Saskatoon. Prior to his appointment as Bishop, Mahoney was a classroom teacher at the former St. Paul's High School and E. D. Feehan Catholic High School. He also served as the first principal of Holy Cross High School. During his episcopate, Bishop Mahoney remained interested and involved in Catholic education and as a speaker in the field of education.

Currently its feeder schools are École Sister O'Brien School, St. Angela School, St. Anne School, St. George School and École St. Paul School.

Sports

Notable alumni
 Brian Guebert – former CFL player with Winnipeg Blue Bombers
 Melissa Hawach – involved in precedent setting multinational custody dispute
 Kelsie Hendry – Olympic pole vaulter
 Jenni Hucul – Canadian bobsledder 
 Kaylyn Kyle – Canadian women's national soccer team player and Olympic bronze medalist
 Cory Mantyka – former CFL player with BC Lions
 Brent Sopel – former NHL player

References 
 

High schools in Saskatoon
Catholic secondary schools in Saskatchewan
Educational institutions established in 1984
1984 establishments in Saskatchewan